Cross-country skiing has been contested at the Winter Olympic Games since the first Winter Games in 1924 in Chamonix, France. The women's events were first contested at the 1952 Winter Olympics.

Summary

Events
C = classical, F = freestyle, m = mass start, p = pursuit, s = skiathlon

Men's

Women's

Medal table 

Sources (after the 2022 Winter Olympics):
Accurate as of 2022 Winter Olympics.

Notes
 2 gold medals and no silver were awarded at 2002 men's 2 × 10 kilometre pursuit.
 2 bronze medals were awarded at 2018 women's 10 kilometre freestyle.

Number of cross-country skiers by nation

See also
Cross-country skiing at the Winter Paralympics
List of Olympic venues in cross-country skiing

References

External links

 
Sports at the Winter Olympics
Skiing at the Winter Olympics

Olympics